BRL-37344 is a drug which acts as a selective agonist of the β3 adrenergic receptor, which has been investigated for various biomedical research applications but never developed for clinical use.

References 

Substituted amphetamines